Świdry may refer to the following places:
Świdry, Łuków County in Lublin Voivodeship (east Poland)
Świdry, Opole Lubelskie County in Lublin Voivodeship (east Poland)
Świdry, Giżycko County in Warmian-Masurian Voivodeship (north Poland)
Świdry, Olecko County in Warmian-Masurian Voivodeship (north Poland)
Świdry, Pisz County in Warmian-Masurian Voivodeship (north Poland)

See also
Swider (disambiguation)